Between Last Night and Us is the debut studio album by Australian blues and roots band, The Audreys. The album peaked at number 97 on the ARIA Charts.

At the ARIA Music Awards of 2006 the album won the ARIA Award for Best Blues and Roots Album and its songs were used as the soundtrack for the 2007 ABC TV series, Rain Shadow.

Track listing
All tracks written by Taasha Coates, Danika Coates, Tristan Goodall, except where noted.

 "You & Steve McQueen" - 3:44
 "A Little More" (Taasha Coates, Tristan Goodall) - 4:37
 "Oh Honey" (Taasha Coates, Tristan Goodall) - 4:29
 "Pale Dress" - 4:55
 "Banjo and Violin" - 3:03
 "Long Ride" (Cam Goodall) - 4:34
 "Nothing Wrong With Me" - 5:41
 "Where Are You Now?" (Taasha Coates, Tristan Goodall) - 4:39
 "Susanne" (Taasha Coates, Tristan Goodall) - 4:46
 "Come On In" - 3:50
 "Monster" - 3:01
 "Don't Change" (INXS) - 4:45

Personnel
The Audreys

Taasha Coates - vocals, melodica, harmonica, ukulele, glockenspiel (10), melodica (5), piano (6, 8, 9, 10)
Tristan Goodall - national reso-phonic guitar, acoustic guitar, banjo
Mikey G - violin, mandolin, harmony vocals
Lyndon Gray - double bass, harmony vocals
Cameron Goodall - vocals, guitar, 12-string acoustic guitar, banjo

Additional musicians

Shane O'Mara - bass (10), spaghetti western guitar, sampler (7), drums (9), lap steel guitar (1, 3)
Howard Cains - double bass (1, 8, 9)
Rob Eyers - drums
Rebecca Barnard - vocals on "Pale Dress"

Charts

Certifications

References

2006 debut albums
ARIA Award-winning albums
The Audreys albums